The following are the association football events of the year 2011 throughout the world.

Events

Men

 5 – 17 January — 2011 Nile Basin Tournament in 
  
  
  
 4th: 
 7 – 22 January — 2011 African Under-17 Championship in 
  
  
  
 4th: 
 7 – 29 January — 2011 AFC Asian Cup in 
  
  
  
 4th: 
 23 January – 13 February — 2011 South American Youth Championship in 
  
  
  
 4th: 
 8 February – 29 May — 2011 Nations Cup in the 
  
  
  
 4th: 
 12 March – 9 April — 2011 South American Under-17 Football Championship in 
  
  
  
 4th: 
 17 April – 2 May (originally 18 March – 1 April) — 2011 African Youth Championship in 
  
  
  
 4th: 
 3 – 15 May — 2011 UEFA European Under-17 Football Championship in 
  
  
 5 – 25 June — 2011 CONCACAF Gold Cup in the 
  
  
 12 – 25 June — 2011 UEFA European Under-21 Football Championship in 
  
  
  
 4th: 
 17 June – 1 July — 2011 CPISRA Football 7-a-side World Championships in the 
  Russia
   Iran
   Ukraine
 4th:  Brazil
 18 June – 10 July — 2011 FIFA U-17 World Cup in 
  
  
  
 4th: 
 1 – 24 July — 2011 Copa América in 
  
  
  
 4th: 
 20 July – 1 August — 2011 UEFA European Under-19 Football Championship in 
  
  
 29 July – 20 August — 2011 FIFA U-20 World Cup in 
  
  
  
 4th: 
 30 September – 4 October — 2011 Long Teng Cup in 
  
  
  
 4th: 
  2 – 11 December — 2011 SAFF Championship in

Women
 2 – 9 March — 2011 Algarve Cup in 
  
  
  
 4th: 
 30 May – 11 June — 2011 UEFA Women's U-19 Championship in 
  
  
 26 June – 17 July — 2011 FIFA Women's World Cup in 
  
  
  
 4th: 
 28 – 31 July — 2011 UEFA U-17 Women's Championship in 
  
  
  
 4th:

News

List of Mexican Football Transfers Winter 2011

North American professional expansion
In 2011, the major leagues of the men's and women's sport in the United States and Canada each added at least one new team:
 Major League Soccer, the top men's league, added its 17th and 18th teams—the Portland Timbers and Vancouver Whitecaps FC.
 Women's Professional Soccer, which currently has teams only in the U.S., added the Western New York Flash, which plays its home games in Rochester.

2011–12 Russian Premier League 
The 2011–12 season is a transitional season of the Russian Premier League, as it will stretch over 18 months instead of the conventional 12 months. The unusual length of the season is the result of the decision to adapt the playing year to an autumn-spring rhythm similar to most of the other UEFA leagues.

The season will comprise two phases. The first phase will consist of a regular home-and-away schedule, meaning that each team will play the other teams twice for a total of 30 matches per team. The league will then be split into two groups for the second phase, where each team plays another home-and-away schedule against every other team of its respective group.

The top eight teams of the first phase will compete for the championship and the spots for both the 2012–13 Champions League and Europa League. Accordingly, the bottom eight teams will have to avoid relegation. The bottom two teams of this group will be directly relegated, while the 13th- and 14-placed teams will compete in a relegation/promotion playoff with the third- and fourth-placed teams of the 2011–12 National League Championship.

Headlines
 5 January: Kristine Lilly, whose 352 appearances for the US women's national team made her the most-capped player in the sport's history, announced her retirement after an international career that started shortly after her 16th birthday in 1987.
 31 January: The 4th highest transfer fee in football history (£49.5m) was recorded, when Fernando Torres signed for Chelsea from Liverpool. Andy Carroll's same-day move from Newcastle United to Liverpool for £35m was the eighth highest fee received for a player.
 June: trials started for people allegedly involved in fixing Finnish football matches.  One team, Tampere United was indefinitely suspended from Finnish football for accepting payments from a person known for match-fixing.
 11 September: The first official match of the recently built, 41,000 seated Juventus Stadium, Juventus 4 – 1 Parma, where Stephan Lichtsteiner scored the first goal in the new stadium on the 17th minute.
 2011 Turkish sports corruption scandal: an ongoing investigation about match fixing, incentive premium, bribery, establishing a criminal organization, organized crime, extortion, threat and intimidation in Turkey's top two association football divisions, the Süper Lig and First League.

61st FIFA Congress
The 61st FIFA Congress was held in Zurich, Switzerland between 31 May and 1 June. At the congress, Sepp Blatter was re-elected as the President of FIFA.

Continental champions

Several international continental tournaments were held to determine berths into the 2011 FIFA Club World Cup.

Most notably, FC Barcelona of Spain's La Liga won the 2011 UEFA Champions League Final against Manchester United of the English Premier League 3–1. The UEFA Champions League is considered by some to be the most preeminent club competition in the World, even more so than the Club World Cup, primarily due to the financial strength of European teams in contrast to clubs in the Americas, Asia, Africa and Oceania.

Elsewhere, the 2011 CONCACAF Champions League Finals was historic in the essence that it was the first final in the modern North American champions league-era not to feature an all-Mexican final. Nevertheless, Monterrey of Mexico's Premiera Division won the 2011 title 3–2 on aggregate over Real Salt Lake of the United States' Major League Soccer. Salt Lake became the first American club to reach a Champions League final, as well as the first American side to reach a top-tier North American club championship since Los Angeles Galaxy in 2000.

New Zealander teams continued their dominance in the OFC Champions League as Auckland City won their second OFC Champions League honor against Amicale of Vanuatu's Premia Divisen.

Al-Sadd of Qatar's Starts League won the 2011 AFC Champions League Final against Jeonbuk Hyundai Motors of the Korean K-League 2–2 (4–2 in penalties). Al-Sadd qualified for the FIFA Club World Cup for the first time after winning its second title in Asia.

On 6 November, the 2011 CAF Champions League Final will be contested between Wydad Casablanca of Morocco's Botola and Espérance Tunis of Tunisia's CLP-1. The second leg will be contested on 12 November.

List of men champions

Women

Domestic champions

AFC nations

CAF nations

CONCACAF nations

CONMEBOL nations

OFC nations
 FFAS Senior League: Pago Youth
 Cook Islands Round Cup: Tupapa Maraerenga
 Fijian National Football League: Ba FC
 FSMFA Top League: Not known
 Kiribati National Championship: Not held
 New Caledonia Division Honneur: AS Mont-Dore
 ASB Premiership: Waitakere United
 Niue Soccer Tournament: Vaiea Sting
 Norfolk Island Soccer League: Not known
 Palau Soccer League: Not held
 Papua New Guinea National Soccer League: Hekari United
 Samoa National League: Kiwi FC
 Solomon Islands National Club Championship: Koloale FC
 Tahiti Division Fédérale: AS Tefana
 Tonga Major League: SC Lotoha'apai
 Tuvalu A-Division: Nauti FC
 Vanuatu Premia Divisen: Amicale FC

UEFA nations

Cup champions

AFC

CAF

CONCACAF

CONMEBOL

OFC

UEFA

Deaths

January 
 1 January – Nikolay Abramov, Russian defender (26)
 4 January – Coen Moulijn, Dutch international forward (73)
 6 January – Uche Okafor, Nigerian international defender (43)
 8 January – Josep Artigas, Spanish international midfielder (87)
 8 January – Ángel Pedraza, Spanish midfielder and manager (48)
 8 January – Thorbjørn Svenssen, Norwegian international defender (86)
 9 January – Richard Butcher, English midfielder (29)
 9 January – Jerzy Woźniak, Polish international defender (78)
 10 January – Bora Kostić, Yugoslavian international striker (80)
 13 January – Charles Muscat, Maltese footballer (48)
 15 January – Nat Lofthouse, English international forward (85)
 16 January – Alcides Silveira, Uruguayan international midfielder (72)
 19 January – Mihai Ionescu, Romanian footballer (74)
 21 January – Wally Hughes, English football coach (76)
 24 January – Alec Boden, Scottish footballer (85)
 24 January – Francisco Hernández, Mexican international midfielder, member of the 1950 FIFA World Cup Mexico squad (83)
 25 January – Kiril Milanov, Bulgarian international forward (62)
 25 January – Bill Holden, English footballer (82)
 27 January – Svein Mathisen, Norwegian international midfielder (58)
 29 January – Corona, Spanish defender (92)
 29 January – Norman Wilkinson, English footballer (79)
 31 January – Norman Uprichard, Northern Irish footballer (82)

February 
 1 February – Les Stubbs, English footballer (81)
 2 February – Jimmy Fell, English footballer (75)
 3 February – Neil Young, English forward (66)
 6 February – William Morais, Brazilian midfielder (19)
 6 February – Billy Gallier, English footballer (78)
 7 February – Eric Parsons, English footballer (87)
 11 February – Josef Pirrung, German footballer (61)
 14 February – Peter Feteris, Dutch footballer (58)
 16 February – Tonny van Ede, Dutch international winger (86)
 17 February – George Clarke, English footballer (89)
 19 February – Ernő Solymosi, Hungarian international defender (70)
 19 February – Norman Corner, English footballer (68)
 20 February – Tony Kellow, English footballer (58)
 21 February – Jean Baeza, French international defender (68)
 22 February – Ivo Pavelić, Croatian footballer (103)
 24 February – Yozhef Betsa, Soviet Ukrainian midfielder, 1956 Olympic champion (81)
 26 February – Kostas Andriopoulos, Greek footballer (26)
 26 February – Dean Richards, English defender (36)
 26 February – Jorge Santoro, Brazilian footballer
 28 February – Jan van Schijndel, Dutch footballer (83)

March 
 5 March – Viktor Voroshilov, Soviet footballer (84)
 6 March – Ján Popluhár, Slovak footballer (75)
 6 March – Reg Stewart, English footballer (85)
 7 March – Adrián Escudero, Spanish footballer (83)
 7 March – Vladimir Brazhnikov, Russian footballer (69)
 8 March – Masoud Boroumand, Iranian footballer (82)
 10 March – Danny Paton, Scottish footballer (75)
 19 March – Barrington Gaynor, Jamaican footballer (45)
 20 March – Néstor de Vicente, Argentine footballer (46)
 21 March – Jesús Aranguren, Spanish defender and coach (66)
 21 March – Ladislav Novák, Czech footballer (79)
 21 March – Hans Boskamp, Dutch footballer (78)
 22 March – Patrick Doeplah, Liberian footballer (22)
 22 March – José Soriano, Peruvian footballer (93)
 23 March – Trevor Storton, English footballer (61)
 26 March – František Havránek, Czech football manager (87)
 31 March – Oddvar Hansen, Norwegian footballer (89)

April 
 3 April – Yevgeny Lyadin, Russian footballer (84)
 4 April – John Niven, Scottish footballer (89)
 4 April – Juan Tuñas, Cuban footballer (93)
 6 April – Jim Blair, Scottish footballer (64)
 6 April – John Morris, English footballer (87)
 10 April – Mikhail Rusyayev, Russian footballer (46)
 11 April – Jimmy Briggs, Scottish footballer (74)
 11 April – Billy Gray, English footballer (83)
 11 April – Doug Newlands, Scottish footballer (79)
 12 April – Ronnie Coyle – Scottish footballer (46)
 12 April – Robert Lokossimbayé, Chadian footballer (35)
 18 April – Olubayo Adefemi, Scottish footballer (25)
 20 April – Allan Brown, Scottish footballer (84)
 16 April – Chinesinho, Brazilian midfielder, winner of the 1966–67 Serie A. (75)
 22 April – Cheung Sai Ho, Hong Kong international midfielder. (35)
 22 April – Wiel Coerver, Dutch footballer (86)
 28 April – Willie O'Neill, Scottish footballer (70)
 30 April – Eddie Turnbull, Scottish footballer (88)

May 
 2 May – Eddie Lewis, English footballer (76)
 2 May – Shigeo Yaegashi, Japanese footballer (78)
 4 May – Sammy McCrory, Northern Irish footballer (86)
 5 May – Yosef Merimovich, Israeli footballer (86)
 5 May – Tomm Wright, Scottish footballer (83)
 6 May – Yoon Ki-won, South Korean footballer (23)
 11 May – Glyn Williams, Welsh footballer (92)
 14 May – Ernie Walker, Scottish footballer administrator (82)
 17 May – Frank Upton, English footballer (76)
 22 May – Alexandru Ene, Romanian footballer (82)
 22 May – Nasser Hejazi, Iranian goalkeeper and coach (61)
 25 May – Miroslav Opsenica, Serbian footballer (29)
 28 May – Hermann Bley, German footballer (75)
 29 May – Billy Crook, English footballer (84)
 30 May – Jung Jong-kwan, South Korean footballer (29)
 30 May – Eddie Morrison, Scottish footballer (63)

June 
 2 June – Willie Phiri, Zambian footballer (57)
 5 June – Célestin Oliver, French footballer (80)
 8 June – Nasir Jalil, Zambian footballer (56)
 9 June – Josip Katalinski, Bosnian footballer (63)
 18 June – Echendu Adiele, Nigerian footballer (32)
 18 June – Ulrich Biesinger, German international forward (77)
 20 June – Vladimir Pettay, Russian football referee (38)
 22 June – Albert Johnson, English footballer (80)
 22 June – Coşkun Özarı, Turkish footballer (80)
 23 June – Dennis Marshall, Costa Rican international defender (25)
 24 June – Tomislav Ivić, Croatian footballer (77)
 26 June – Jung Jung-suk South Korean footballer (28)
 26 June – Jan van Beveren, Dutch footballer (63)
 27 June – Ken Bainbridge, English footballer (90)
 27 June – Mike Boyle, English footballer (64)
 28 June – Giorgio Bernardin, Italian footballer (83)
 29 June – Carlos Diarte, Paraguayan footballer (57)

July 
 1 July – Wille Fernie, Scottish footballer (82)
 16 July – Bertalan Bicskei, Hungarian footballer (66)
 16 July – Charlie Woollett, English footballer (91)
 17 July – Juan Arza, Spanish international forward and manager (88)
 17 July – Ștefan Sameș, Romanian footballer (59)
 18 July – Salvador Bernárdez, Honduran footballer
 22 July – Cees de Wolf, Dutch footballer (65)
 26 July – Jacques Fatton, Swiss footballer (85)
 31 July – Andrea Pazzagli, Italian footballer (51)

August 
 4 August – Naoki Matsuda, Japanese international defender (34)
 5 August – Stan Willemse, English footballer (86)
 6 August – Kuno Klötzer, German footballer (89)
 7 August – Eddie Gibbins, English footballer (85)
 11 August – Mark Sinyangwe, Zambian footballer (31)
 11 August – Ignacio Flores, Mexican international defender (58)
 13 August – Álvaro Lara, Chilean footballer (26)
 14 August – Fritz Korbach, German footballer (66)
 15 August – Nenad Bijedić, Bosnian football manager (51)
 16 August – Frank Munro, Scottish footballer (63)
 19 August – Yevhen Yevseyev, Ukrainian footballer (24)
 21 August – Ezra Sued, Argentine footballer (88)
 22 August – Žarko Nikolić, Serbian footballer (72)
 24 August – George Knight, English footballer (90)
 24 August – Alfons Van Brandt, Belgian footballer (84)
 27 August – John Parke, Northern Irish footballer (74)
 28 August – Bernie Gallacher, Scottish footballer (44)
 29 August – Mark Ovendale, English footballer (37)
 30 August – João Carlos Batista Pinheiro, Brazilian footballer (79)

September 
 5 September – Robert Ballaman, Swiss footballer (85)
 6 September – Masanori Sanada, Japanese international goalkeeper (43)
 9 September – Laurie Hughes, English footballer (87)
 11 September – Ralph Gubbins, English footballer (79)
 17 September – Ferenc Szojka, Hungarian footballer (80)
 20 September – Aleksei Mamykin, Russian footballer (75)
 25 September – Theyab Awana, UAE international winger (21)
 25 September – Norman Lawson English footballer
 27 September – Chus Pereda, Spanish international midfielder and manager (73)
 30 September – Mykhaylo Forkash, Ukrainian footballer (63)

October 
 3 October – Zakaria Zerouali, Moroccan footballer (33)
 5 October – Edward Acquah, Ghanaian footballer (76)
 5 October – Níver Arboleda, Colombian footballer (43)
 5 October – Richard Holmlund, Swedish football manager (47)
 7 October – Julien Bailleul, French footballer (23)
 11 October – Henk Hofs, Dutch footballer (60)
 11 October – Derrick Ward, English footballer (76)
 19 October – Édison Chará, Colombian footballer (31)
 23 October – Winston Griffiths, Jamaican footballer (33)
 25 October – Leonidas Andrianopoulos, Greek footballer (100)
 31 October – Flórián Albert, Hungarian striker (70)

November 
 8 November – Jimmy Adamson, English footballer (82)
 8 November – Valentin Ivanov, Russian footballer (76)
 9 November – Ézio Leal Moraes Filho, Brazilian footballer (45)
 12 November – Alun Evans (FAW), Welsh footballer administrator (69)
 13 November – Bobsam Elejiko, Nigerian footballer (30)
 14 November – Alf Fields, English footballer (92)
 14 November – Alf Fields, English defender (92)
 16 November – Djamel Keddou, Algerian footballer (59)
 18 November – Jones Mwewa, Zambian footballer (38)
 19 November – Karl Aage Præst, Danish footballer (89)
 20 November – David Cargill, English footballer (75)
 20 November – Mario Martiradonna, Italian footballer (73)
 21 November – Jim Lewis, English footballer (84)
 22 November – Pío Corcuera, Argentine footballer (90)
 23 November – Henry Øberg, Norwegian football referee (80)
 24 November – Humberto Medina, Mexican footballer (69)
 24 November – Johnny Williams, English footballer (76)
 26 November – István Gajda, Hungarian footballer (30)
 27 November – Gary Speed, Welsh international midfielder and manager (42)
 28 November – Aruwa Ameh, Nigerian footballer (20)

December 
 1 December – Hippolyte Van den Bosch, Belgian footballer (85)
 2 December – Artur Quaresma, Portuguese footballer (94)
 4 December – Sócrates, Brazilian international midfielder (57)
 5 December – Gennady Logofet, Russian footballer (69)
 6 December – Lawrie Tierney, Scottish footballer (52)
 7 December – Peter Croker, English footballer (89)
 8 December – Peter Brown, English footballer (77)
 8 December – Vinko Cuzzi, Croatian footballer (71)
 8 December – Giorgio Mariani, Italian footballer (65)
 9 December – Len Phillips, English footballer (89)
 10 December – Hamilton Bobby, Indian footballer
 13 December – Klaus-Dieter Sieloff, German international footballer (69)
 14 December – Pedro Febles, Venezuelan footballer (53)
 19 December – Luciano Magistrelli, Italian footballer (73)
 19 December – Héctor Núñez, Uruguayan footballer (75)
 23 December – Neil Davids, English footballer (56)
 25 December – Christophe Laigneau, French footballer (46)
 25 December – George Robb, English footballer (85)
 27 December – Catê, Brazilian footballer (38)
 29 December – Ron Howells, Welsh footballer (84)
 29 December – Ked Johnson, English footballer (80)
 31 December – Roy Greenwood, English footballer (80)

Footnotes

References 

 
Association football by year